Rodarius Jaiquan Thomas (born July 28, 2002) is an American football wide receiver for Georgia. He originally played for Mississippi State.

High school career
Thomas attended Eufaula High School in Eufaula, Alabama. As a senior, he had 55 receptions for 945 yards and 13 touchdowns. He committed to Mississippi State University to play college football.

College career

Mississippi State
As a true freshman at Mississippi State in 2021, Thomas played in 10 games with three starts and had 18 receptions for 252 yards and five touchdowns. He returned to Mississippi State as a starter in 2022. Following the 2022 season Thomas entered the transfer portal and signed with Georgia.

Georgia
On December 22, 2022, Thomas transferred to Georgia.

Arrest
Thomas was arrested early Monday January 23, 2023 by university police on two charges including one felony.  He was charged with felony false imprisonment and misdemeanor battery family violence 1st offense, according to the Clarke County Jail online booking report.

References

External links
Mississippi State Bulldogs bio

2002 births
Living people
Players of American football from Alabama
American football wide receivers
Mississippi State Bulldogs football players